Shaveh (also Romanized as Shāveh and Shāvah; also known as Shāhābād) is a village in Sabzdasht Rural District, in the Central District of Kabudarahang County, Hamadan Province, Iran. At the 2006 census, its population was 923, in 242 families.

References 

Populated places in Kabudarahang County